The Quireboys are an English rock band formed in 1984 in London, with strong ties to Newcastle. When the band formed they were originally known as The Queerboys and later as the London Quireboys in the United States and Canada, settling at last with their current name.

History

1985–89: Formation
Vocalist Jonathan Gray (commonly referred to as just 'Spike') moved from Newcastle upon Tyne to London when he was 17 years old. 

By the mid-1980s, the two decided to form a rock and roll band, the name chosen for the group was originally 'The Choirboys' taken from the 1977 movie of the same name, but they soon changed it to the Queerboys. 

The Queerboys started to build up a following, playing at the Marquee Club. The band's drummer Paul Hornby soon left to join Dogs D'Amour, which contained future friends of the Quireboys, he was replaced by Nick Connell (known as Cozy). 

On 28 March 1986, the Queerboys appeared with Bernie Torme and the Moho Pack at what was Klub Foot at the  Clarendon Hotel, Hammersmith. In May of that year, they played support dates on a Cherry Bombz tour.

By 1987, the band's controversial name was starting to hinder them, it caused some of the gigs on their tour with Andy McCoy's band to be cancelled. They were also booked to play Reading Festival, on the understanding that they would change their name. Thus they changed it to the Quireboys and have kept the name ever since.

1990–95: A Bit of What You Fancy and Bitter Sweet & Twisted
Sharon Osbourne was appointed as manager and the Quireboys were signed to EMI for the release of their debut album, A Bit of What You Fancy. By 1990, the Quireboys had fired Ginger (who went on to form the Wildhearts), who they replaced with former Cradle Snatchers / Feline Groove guitarist Guy Griffin. For the debut album, Cozy was substituted by Ian Wallace who played with Bob Dylan.

The debut album was produced by Jim Cregan and George Tutko at Cherokee Studios in Los Angeles, California. Ron Nevison mixed the album. The band entered the UK Albums Chart at No. 2. A Bit of What You Fancy drew positive reviews and was compared favourably to British rock names such as Rod Stewart and Faces.

The long touring schedule was finished off with a gig in Japan at the Tokyo Dome on New Year's Eve in front of 50,000 people. A live album was released following this long touring, entitled Live (Recorded Around the World).

The band began working on their second album in October 1991 with producer Bob Rock. The project saw numerous delays due to Rock's other engagements, and personnel changes at EMI. In the spring of 1992, Chris Kimsey was brought in to re-work some of the tracks. Bitter Sweet & Twisted was finally released in March 1993 and peaked at no. 31 on the UK Albums Chart.

Following the release of Bitter Sweet & Twisted, the Quireboys disbanded for eight years. Griffin attributed the breakup to "business stuff" and the emergence of grunge music. Following a run of successful live shows in Los Angeles, they decided to revive the band in 2001 with a new lineup.

1994–2000: Solo projects
In the interim, the Quireboys members embarked on their own recording projects. In 1995, Spike formed a duo with Darrell Bath of The Dogs D'Amour. Their album, Take Out Some Insurance, was released under the moniker Spike n' Darrell. In the following year, Spike formed the duo Hot Knives with Tyla, and together they released Flagrantly Yours. Spike's debut solo album, Blue Eyed Soul, was released in 1997. In the same year, Spike released one album as part of the band God's Hotel.

2001–2021: Reformation and subsequent albums
The Quireboys' reformation began with the release of their third studio album, This Is Rock'n'Roll, in July 2001. AllMusic described it as one of the band's "more consistent, focused and inspired efforts".

The band's fourt studio album, Well Oiled, was released in 2004 through SPV.

On 12 May 2008, the Quireboys released their fifth album, Homewreckers & Heartbreakers, through Jerkin' Crocus.  Talking about the inspiration for the new album, Paul Guerin said "It's a funny story.  We were in Malmö, Sweden in the dressing room.  It was just before the show and we'd had a few frothy quenchers.  We were trying to come up with album titles, and everyone was laughing at the suggestions.  A certain member of the band was regaling a story about something he'd done, and another member of the band said "you're just a home wrecker," and someone else said "yeah, and a heartbreaker".  We were just having a laugh, and bang, there it was.  It was as simple as that." 

In March 2013, the Quireboys played aboard the Monsters of Rock Cruise, along with bands such as Cinderella, Tesla, Kix, and Queensrÿche. The band released a new single "Too Much of a Good Thing" on 15 May 2013, taken from their seventh studio album, Beautiful Curse, which was released a month later in June 2013.

The band's most recent album, Amazing Disgrace, was released on 5 April 2019. 

In late 2021 they supported the Dead Daisies on their UK Tour. The February 2022 Monsters of Rock Cruise included the Quireboys as a five-piece, with Griffin covering vocal duties, after "a last-minute nonappearance" from Spike.

2022–present: Spike's departure and ongoing dispute
In March 2022, the Quireboys announced that they had released lead vocalist Spike from the band. This sparked a mixed reaction from fans, leading two venues to cancel their upcoming Quireboys dates. However, the band continue to tour with Guy Griffin as lead vocalist. In 2023, they will complete tours of Germany and the UK, and will perform at Hellfest in Clisson, France.

Spike's departure sparked an ongoing dispute about legal ownership of the Quireboys name. In May 2022, Spike announced that he was reuniting with original members Guy Bailey and Nigel Mogg to write and record new music using the Quireboys name. He later announced an upcoming concert in London featuring ex-Quireboys members Chris Johnstone and Rudy Richman, due to take place in December 2022. On 9 December 2022, they released a two-track single "Merry Christmas and a Happy New Year" in support of Care After Combat, a charity for British combat veterans.

On 7 December 2022, the remaining band members released a live album recorded at O2 Forum Kentish Town in September 2022. Their first album without Spike, titled The Band Rolls On..., is expected for release in December. The lead single "Lie to Me" was released on 5 December.

Personnel

Current members
Following an ongoing dispute about the band's name, there are currently two Quireboys lineups:

Quireboys
Spike – lead vocal (1984–1993, 1995, 2001–present)
Guy Bailey – guitar (1984–1993, 1995, 2022–present)
Chris Johnstone – keyboards (1984–1993, 1995, 2022–present)
Nigel Mogg – bass (1984–1993, 1995, 2001–2005, 2022–present)
Rudy Richman - drums (1990-1993, 2022-present)

The Quireboys
Guy Griffin – guitar (1989–1993, 1995, 2001–present) lead vocal (2022–present)
Paul Guerin – guitar (2004–present)
Keith Weir – keyboards (2001–present)
Nick Mailing – bass (2013–present)
Pip Mailing – drums (2004–2009, 2019–present)

Former members
Paul Hornby – drums (died 2015)
Nick "Cozy" Connell – drums
Ginger – guitar (1987-1989)
Ian Wallace
Kevin Savigar – Keyboards
Martin Henderson – Drums (2001–2002)
Luke Bossendorfer – Guitar (2001–2003)
Bill Coyne – Drums (1984)
Tom Golzen – Guitar (1984)
Michael Lee – Drums (died 2008)
Tim Bewlay - Bass
Damon Williams – Bass
Jimmi Crutchley – Bass
 Dave Boyce – Bass
 Gary "Gaz" Ivin – Bass
 Phil Martini – Drums
 Matt Goom – Drums
 Dave McCluskey – Drums
 Share Ross – Bass (USA MOR Cruise)
 Jason Bonham – Drums (UK MOR Arena Tour)

Timeline

Discography

Albums

Live albums
Live (Recorded Around the World) (EMI – 1990)
Lost in Space (Snapper – 2000)
100% Live (Demolition – 2002)
Quireboys Live (EMI – 2006) (Reissue of 1990 live album)
Live in Glasgow (Jerkin Crocus – 2011)
35 & Live (Off yer Rocker – 2020)

Compilation albums
From Tooting to Barking (Griffin – 1994)
Rock Champions (EMI – 2001)
Masters of Rock – The Quireboys (EMI – 2002)
Best of the Quireboys (EMI – 2008)

Singles

Videography
A Bit of What You Fancy (1990)
Bitter, Sweet & Live (Live at The Town & Country Club, London) (1993)
One More for the Road (Live at The Mean Fiddler, London) (2006)

References

External links

English blues rock musical groups
English hard rock musical groups
English glam metal musical groups
Musical groups from Newcastle upon Tyne
Musical groups from London
Musical groups established in 1984
1984 establishments in England